Arnab Rai Choudhuri is an Indian scientist working in the area of Astrophysical MHD, specially in context of solar magnetic cycle.

Career
He obtained his Bachelor of Science degree in 1978 from the Presidency College under the University of Calcutta and his M.Sc degree in physics from the Indian Institute of Technology Kanpur.
He earned his Ph.D at the University of Chicago in 1985 working under the supervision of Professor E.N. Parker. For next two years till 1987 he did research at the High Altitude Observatory, Boulder, USA. In 1987, he joined the Physics Department of Indian Institute of Science (IISc) as lecturer and became professor there in 2002.

Research
His research mainly deals with the study of astrophysical MHD problems specifically solar dynamo modelling.

He is an author of two advanced textbooks and a popular science book.

References

External links

Living people
Indian astrophysicists
20th-century Indian physicists
Bengali scientists
Indian space scientists
University of Calcutta alumni
IIT Kanpur alumni
University of Chicago alumni
Academic staff of the Indian Institute of Science
1956 births
Scientists from Kolkata